Take Your Pick is an album by guitarists Larry Carlton and Tak Matsumoto that was released by Vermillion on June 2, 2010, in Japan, and later on 335 Records in the US and on Forward in Taiwan. The album debuted at number 2 on the Japanese Oricon weekly album charts. The album won an award for Best Pop Instrumental Album at the 53rd Grammy Awards. It also won the "Jazz Album of the Year" award at 25th Japan Gold Disc Awards.

Track listing
All songs arranged by Larry Carlton, Tak Matsumoto & Hideyuki Terachi

Musicians 
 Larry Carlton – guitar
 Tak Matsumoto – guitar
 Mike Haynes – trumpet
 Osamu Ueishi – trumpet
 Barry Green – trombone
 Azusa Tojo – trombone
 Mark Douthit – saxophone
 Watanabe Fire – saxophone
 Kazuhiro Takeda – saxophone
 Jeff Babko – keyboards
 Michael Rhodes – bass guitar
 Billy Kilson – drums

References

2010 albums
Larry Carlton albums
Being Inc. albums
Instrumental albums
Grammy Award for Best Contemporary Instrumental Album